The Suzhou Taihu Ladies Open was a professional golf tournament on the Ladies European Tour (LET) and Ladies Asian Golf Tour (LAGT). The first LET event held in China, it was played at the Suzhou Taihu International Golf Club in Shanghai.  The 54-hole tournament was founded in 2008, and was held until 2013.

The inaugural event was won by Annika Sörenstam, and having retired from professional golf at the end of the season, it turned out to be her last victory.

Winners

References

External links
Ladies European Tour official site
Official site 

Former Ladies European Tour events
Golf tournaments in China
Sports competitions in Shanghai
Recurring sporting events established in 2008
Recurring sporting events disestablished in 2013
2008 establishments in China
2013 disestablishments in China